The Administration des chemins de fer d'Alsace et de Lorraine or AL (English: Alsace and Lorraine Railways) was a rail transport administration created on 19 June 1919.

On 1 January 1938, the Alsace and Lorraine Railways were nationalised, as were the other main railway companies, to become part of the Société nationale des chemins de fer français (SNCF).

See also 
 Imperial Railways in Alsace-Lorraine

Railway companies of France